Francovich v Italy (1991) C-6/90 was a decision of the European Court of Justice which established that European Union Member States could be liable to pay compensation to individuals who suffered a loss by reason of the Member State's failure to transpose an EU directive into national law. This principle is sometimes known as the principle of state liability or "the rule in Francovich" in European Union law.

Facts
Under the Insolvency Protection Directive 80/987 (now 2008/94/EC) EU Member States were expected to enact provisions in their national law to provide for a minimum level of insurance for employees who had wages unpaid if their employers went insolvent. Mr Francovich, who had worked in Vicenza for CDN Elettronica SnC, was owed 6 million Lira, and Mrs Bonifaci and 33 of her colleagues were owed 253 million Lira together after their company, Gaia Confezioni Srl, had gone bankrupt. The Directive was meant to be implemented by 1983, but five years later they had been paid nothing, as the company liquidators had informed them that no money was left. They brought a claim against the Italian state, arguing that it must pay damages to compensate for their losses instead, on account of a failure to implement the Directive.

Judgment
The European Court of Justice held that the Italian government had breached its obligations, and was liable to compensate the workers' loss resulting from the breach. The Court further held that the damages for such breaches should be available before national courts, and that to establish state liability on the basis of the failure to implement a directive, claimants must prove that the directive conferred specific rights on them, identifiable in its wording, and that there is a causal link between the state's failure to implement the directive and the loss suffered.

Enforcement
The court stipulated that national procedures should determine how each Member State's liability was to be enforced.

See also

United Kingdom labour law
European labour law
Direct effect
Incidental effect
Indirect effect

Notes

External links
Francovich and Bonifaci v Republic of Italy (Cases C-6 and 9/90) [1991] ECR I-5375

Court of Justice of the European Union case law
1991 in case law
1991 in Italy
Italian case law